Neobola bottegoi is a species of ray-finned fish in the family Cyprinidae.
It is endemic to Lake Turkana and the Omo River of Ethiopia. It can reach a maximum length of 7.3 cm.

Named in honor of Italian Army officer Vittorio Bottego (1860-1897), who led expedition to Somalia (1895-1897), during which type specimen was collected.

References

Neobola
Fish of Ethiopia
Fish of Lake Turkana
Taxa named by Decio Vinciguerra
Fish described in 1895